Kanza Khan  
professionally known as Ayeza Khan (born 15 January 1991), is a Pakistani actress and model. She has garnered commercial success and critical acclaim throughout her career. Best known for Pyare Afzal, Mere Pas Tum Ho and Chupke Chupke, she is the recipient of several accolades including Lux Style Awards, Hum Awards and Pakistan International Screen Awards.

Khan has appeared in television shows including Mere Meherbaan (2014), Pyarey Afzal (2014), Tum Kon Piya (2016), Mohabbat Tumse Nafrat Hai (2017), Koi Chand Rakh (2018), Yaariyan (2019) and Chupke Chupke (2021). She receives critical acclaim for her portrayal of Mehwish in Mere Paas Tum Ho.

Career 
Ayeza Khan has participated in a contest "Pantene Shine Princess" while studying in school and came out as first runner up. Soon after this, she was offered to work as a model in a telecom advertisement and then she started focusing on modelling. While starting her college, she started to take more modelling offers and eventually shifted to showbiz rather than carrying on her studies.

She was offered a supporting role in a comedy-drama Tum Jo Miley in 2009 opposite Fahad Mustafa, Sunita Marshal, and many others. In 2010 she offered the main lead in the drama serial ‘Pul Sirat’. After supporting roles in several television series, she appeared as leading actress in the Geo TV romantic drama Tootay Huway Per (2011).

Breakthrough and success
In 2014 her performance in the drama serial Pyaray Afzal earned her the Best Actress Award in Lux Style Awards. She got many offers from Bollywood, which she rejected and took a break for a while from the industry after her marriage.

She later appeared after a gap of two years with the tragic romance Tum Kon Piya (2016), with Imran Abbas. Her serial Koi Chand Rakh includes Imran Abbas, Muneeb Butt, and Areeba Habib.

Her performance in the 2019–20 romantic drama Meray Paas Tum Ho earnerd her Pakistan International Screen Award for Best Television Actress.

In 2021, she appeared in the comedy serial Chupke Chupke, opposite Osman Khalid Butt.

Personal life 
Khan married actor Danish Taimoor in 2014, after an 8-year relationship since 2006, shared by the couple in morning show Ek Nayee Subha with Farah on A-Plus. Danish Taimoor while talking to Maria Wasti at Croron Mein Khel-Bol TV on 25 March 2020 revealed that he met Ayeza Khan 1st time on Social Networking Website. She gave birth to a daughter in 2015, and a son in 2017.

Her off-screen roles include duties as a brand ambassador for several products.

Television

Special appearance

Telefilm

Awards and nominations 

! Refs
|-
! style="background:#bfd7ff;" colspan="5" |Hum Awards
|-
| rowspan="2"|2015
| rowspan="2"|Mere Meherbaan
| Best Actress Popular
| rowspan="2" 
|
|-
| Best Actress Jury
|
|-
| rowspan="4"|2022
| rowspan="4"|Chupke Chupke
| Best Actress Popular
| 
| 
|-
| Best Actress Jury
| 
| 
|-
| Best Onscreen Couple with Osman Khalid Butt
| 
| 
|-
| Best Onscreen Couple Jury with Osman Khalid Butt
| 
| 
|-
! style="background:#bfd7ff;" colspan="5" |Lux Style Awards
|-
| 2015
| Pyaray Afzal
| rowspan="2"|Best TV Actress
| 
|
|-
|2020
| Mere Paas Tum Ho
| 
|
|-
| 2021
| Mehar Posh| Best TV Actress (Viewers' choice)
| 
| 
|-
| 2022
| Chupke Chupke| Best Actress (Viewers' choice)
| 
| 
|-
! style="background:#bfd7ff;" colspan="5" |Pakistan International Media Awards
|-
| 2020
| Mere Paas Tum Ho| Best Television Actress
| 
|
|-
! style="background:#bfd7ff;" colspan="5" |Hum Style Awards
|-
| 2020
| Mere Paas Tum Ho| Most Stylish TV Actress
| 
|
|-
! style="background:#bfd7ff;" colspan="5" |Pakistan International Screen Awards
|-
| 2020
| Meray Paas Tum Ho''
| Best TV Actress
|
|
|}

References

External links 
 

Living people
People from Karachi
Pakistani female models
21st-century Pakistani actresses
1991 births
Pakistani television actresses